Mianak may refer to:
 Mianak, Babol
 Mianak, Chalus
 Mianak, Nowshahr